Anatrachyntis melanostigma is a moth in the family Cosmopterigidae. It was described by Alexey Diakonoff in 1954 and is known from New Guinea.

References

Moths described in 1954
Anatrachyntis
Moths of New Guinea